The Gagasan Sejahtera (English: Ideas of Prosperity, abbrev: GS) was a coalition of opposition Islamist political parties which promote the "ideas of peace" in Malaysia. The informal electoral pact was formed initially on 16 March 2016 by Pan-Malaysian Islamic Party (PAS) and Parti Ikatan Bangsa Malaysia (IKATAN) as a Third Force to face both ruling Barisan Nasional (BN) and the opposition Pakatan Harapan (PH) coalitions in the upcoming 2018 Malaysian general election (GE14). It had announced on 13 August 2016 the pact to be formally called Gagasan Sejahtera. Pan-Malaysian Islamic Front (BERJASA) had later joined the coalition on 23 September 2016. The formation of the alliance brought criticism from both the main coalitions of BN and PH.
 
Gagasan Sejahtera is also considered a successor to the dissolved opposition Pakatan Rakyat (PR) coalition which PAS had been a part of it formerly and PH being the other one new coalition which PAS decided not joining. The main campaign of the alliance focuses mainly on PAS political agenda and uniting Malay Muslims matters, while upholding democracy as the best way to govern the country.

In May 2018, the Gagasan Sejahtera pact of the three opposition parties led by PAS as the core mover, along with minor parties IKATAN and BERJASA finally contested using the PAS logo the GE14, but only PAS managed to win seats in the election, securing 18. IKATAN was allotted to field candidates in five non-Muslim seats in Selangor, while BERJASA was given 'unwinnable' seats. Both parties failed to win any of the seats, with all of their candidates losing their deposits. BERJASA for the reason had left tacitly the alliance to contest 2019 Tanjung Piai by-election on its own ticket as PAS and GS supported BN instead of BERJASA recontesting by its president as candidate.

The alliance's strategic partners Love Malaysia Party (PCM) and People's Alternative Party (PAP), also failed in chosen non-Muslim seats in Penang. The yet to be registered Parti Harapan Malaysia (PHM) was another strategic partner but did not contest.

The alliance became inactive after PAS aligned itself with former rival United Malays National Organisation (UMNO) to set-up Muafakat Nasional (MN) while affiliating along with UMNO's offshoot the Malaysian United Indigenous Party (BERSATU). PAS further distanced itself from the alliance by joining Perikatan Nasional (PN), the new ruling coalition, during the chaotic events of the 2020–2022 political crisis during the 14th Malaysian Parliament term.

Member parties and strategic partners

Elected representatives

Dewan Negara (Senate)

Senators 

 Kelantan State Legislative Assembly:
 Asmak Husin
 Muhamad Mustafa
 Terengganu State Legislative Assembly:
 Husain Awang
 Nuridah Mohd Salleh

House of Representatives

Members of Parliament of the 14th Malaysian Parliament 

Gagasan Sejahtera has 18 members of the House of Representatives, with all of them from PAS.

Dewan Undangan Negeri (State Legislative Assembly) 

Gagasan Sejahtera has 91 members of the State Legislative Assembly, with all of them from PAS. It has representatives in every assembly other than those of Negeri Sembilan, Malacca, Sabah and Sarawak. The coalition holds a majority in the Kelantan and Terengganu State Legislative Assemblies, and supplies all the members of the state's Executive Council (a body akin to a Cabinet), led by Menteri Besar, Ahmad Yakob.

Kelantan State Legislative Assembly
Terengganu State Legislative Assembly
Kedah State Legislative Assembly
Pahang State Legislative Assembly

Perlis State Legislative Assembly
Perak State Legislative Assembly
Penang State Legislative Assembly

Selangor State Legislative Assembly
Johor State Legislative Assembly
Malacca State Legislative Assembly

Negeri Sembilan State Legislative Assembly
Sabah State Legislative Assembly
Sarawak State Legislative Assembly

Notes

References

External links 
 
 

Defunct political party alliances in Malaysia
Far-right politics in Asia
Islamist groups
Islamism
Islamic political parties in Malaysia
Social conservative parties